Anil V Kumar (born 4 June 1975) is a television and film director and producer in India. He started his production house "Flying Turtle Films" with his partners Shabbir Ahluwalia and Sakett Saawhney in 2010. The shows he has directed include Kahaani Ghar Ghar Kii and Kahin To Hoga, both on Star Plus. In 2013, Flying Turtle Films co-produced the movie Zanjeer starring Priyanka Chopra and  Ram Charan.

Director

Television
 Kundali Bhagya 
 Dekha Ek Khwaab - Sony TV (Rose movies) 
 Kitani Mohabbat Hai - NDTV Imagine (250 episodes) 
 Kis Desh Mein Hai Meraa Dil -Star plus( 100 episodes)
 Karam Apnaa Apnaa - Star TV(150 episodes)
 Kavyanjali - Star Plus ( 50 episodes) 
 Kayamath - Star Plus ( 200 episodes)
 Kkoi Dil Mein Hai - Sony TV ( 100 episodes)
 Kitni Mast Hai Zindagi- MTV (full) 
 Kasamh Se - Zee TV.(250 episodes) 
 Kahin To Hoga - Star TV.(250 episodes)
 Kahaani Ghar Ghar Kii - Star Plus (350 episodes) 
 Kkusum -  Sony TV.( 380 episodes) 
 Kaun-  DD National.(12 episodes) 
 Sujata- Sony TV (BR Telefilms)
 Ramlal 1947- DJ's Creative Unit
 Ganga Kii Dheej - Sahara One
 Savitri- Lifeok
 Jodha Akbar - Zee TV
 Manasu Mamatha
 Meri Aashiqui Tumse Hi- Colors TV 
 Itna Karo Na Mujhe Pyaar- Sony TV

Web series

Producer

Television
Ganga Kii Dheej ( Sahara One)
 Savitri (LifeOk)
 Savdhaan India (Lifeok)

Films
Zanjeer (2013 film) Starring Priyanka Chopra, Ram Charan Teja, Sanjay Dutt, Mahie Gill

References

External links
 https://www.imdb.com/name/nm1667633/
 https://timesofindia.indiatimes.com/web-series/news/hungama-play-launches-kashmakash-a-new-original-show-featuring-5-unique-stories-of-modern-day-crimes/articleshow/74380594.cms

Indian television directors
Indian television producers
1975 births
Living people